The Moscow Line of Defence was a front of the Red Army during the Second World War. On 19 July 1941 it was set up to organise the defence of Moscow and on 30 July 1941 it was dissolved and its forces transferred to the Reserve Front.

Soviet fronts
Military history of Moscow